"Love Made Me Stupid" is a dance/pop song by Swedish singer Elin Lanto and is the lead single from her second album "Love Made Me Do It" (her three previous singles were not originally on the album). The song features the introduction of a synth/rock movement in Lanto's music and this song in particular is noted for its dark tones.

The song is about Lanto's lament that she has lost her mind because she is consumed with love – "I’ve lost my friends because of you, I’ve got no money because of you, I’ve lost my IQ because of you". The video captures this as it features a desolate, lonely Lanto in various states of despair.

This song saw Lanto's return to music since her 2008 single "Discotheque" and a new direction in music, despite all this the single failed to chart in her native Sweden.

References

External links

2009 singles
Synth-pop songs
Songs written by Tony Nilsson
2009 songs